Haller's organ is a complex sensory organ possessed by ticks. Ticks, being obligate parasites, must find a host in order to survive; via olfaction and the sensing of humidity, temperature, and carbon dioxide, Haller's organ detects  them. Haller's organ is a minute cavity at the terminal segment of the first pair of a tick's legs (not the pedipalps). Each one is composed of a pit and a capsule, which contain sensory setae.

References

Arthropod morphology
Ticks